Roman Forest is a city in Montgomery County, Texas, United States. The population was 1,781 at the 2020 census.

Government

The city of Roman Forest is governed by a mayor and five council members. The city also operates its own police department and municipal court. Fire and first responder services are provided by Montgomery County Emergency Service District No. 7, also known as the East Montgomery County Fire Department.

In the Texas Senate, Roman Forest is part of District 4, represented by Republican Brandon Creighton. In the Texas House of Representatives, Roman Forest is part of District 16, represented by Republican Will Metcalf.

In the United States Senate, Republicans John Cornyn and Ted Cruz represent the entire state of Texas. In the United States House of Representatives, Roman Forest is part of District 8, represented by Republican Kevin Brady.

The United States Postal Service does not operate a post office in Roman Forest. The nearest post office is located in New Caney.

Geography

Roman Forest is located at  (30.177744, –95.156209).

Climate

The climate in this area is characterized by hot, humid summers and generally mild to cool winters.  According to the Köppen Climate Classification system, Roman Forest has a humid subtropical climate, abbreviated "Cfa" on climate maps.

Demographics

As of the 2020 United States census, there were 1,781 people, 678 households, and 542 families residing in the city.

As of the 2010 United States Census, there were 1,538 people, 547 households, and 468 families residing in the town.  The racial makeup of the town was 92.0% White, 1.3% African American, 0.4% Native American, 1.9% Asian, 3.1% from other races, and 1.3% from two or more races. Hispanic or Latino of any race were 10.3% of the population.

There were 547 households, out of which 30.5% had children under the age of 18 living with them, 74.8% were married couples living together, 6.8% had a female householder with no husband present, and 14.4% were non-families. 11.9% of all households were made up of individuals. The average household size was 2.80 and the average family size was 3.00.

In the city the population was spread out, with 23.3% under the age of 18, 6.2% from 18 to 24, 22.6% from 25 to 44, 32.5% from 45 to 64, and 15.2% who were 65 years of age or older. The median age was 43.6 years. For every 100 females, there were 93.7 males. For every 100 females age 18 and over, there were 95.2 males.

According to the 2015 American Community Survey, The median income for a household in the town was $93,289, and the median income for a family was $95,505. Males had a median income of $50,343 versus $40,074 for females. The per capita income for the town was $30,982. About 0.6% of families and 2.0% of the population were below the poverty line, including 0.7% of those under age 18 and 9.6% of those age 65 or over.

Education 

Roman Forest is served by New Caney Independent School District.

Residents are zoned to Dogwood Elementary School, Keefer Crossing Middle School, and New Caney High School.

Aikin Elementary School was the elementary school serving Roman Forest. From 2015–2017, Tavola Elementary served the Roman Forest community while Aikin Elementary was being rebuilt. Aikin Elementary will reopen in August 2017 as Dogwood Elementary.  All Roman Forest students will attend Dogwood Elementary at the start of the 2017–2018 New Caney ISD school year.

The Texas Legislature designated New Caney ISD (and therefore Roman Forest) as part of Lone Star College (formerly the North Harris Montgomery Community College District).

Notes

References

External links

Towns in Montgomery County, Texas
Towns in Texas
Greater Houston